The Roman Catholic Diocese of Jasikan is a diocese located in the city of Jasikan in the Ecclesiastical province of Accra in Ghana.

History
 December 19, 1994: Established as Diocese of Jasikan from Diocese of Keta–Ho

Leadership
 Bishops of Jasikan (Roman rite)
 Bishop Gabriel Akwasi Abiabo Mante (since December 19, 1994)

See also
Roman Catholicism in Ghana

Sources
 GCatholic.org
 Catholic Hierarchy

Roman Catholic dioceses in Ghana
Dioceses in Ghana
Christian organizations established in 1994
Roman Catholic dioceses and prelatures established in the 20th century
Roman Catholic Ecclesiastical Province of Accra